Robert E. Newnham, also known as Bob Newnham, (28 March 1929 – 16 April 2009) was an American academic and writer who was a Alcoa Professor Emeritus of Solid State Science at the Pennsylvania State University. He is known for his contributions in the field of ferroelectrics.

Biography 
Newnham was born on 28 March 1929 in Amsterdam, New York, United States. He married with Patricia Friss Newnham and they have two children.

He completed his bachelor's of science degree in mathematics in 1950 at Hartwick College and master's of science degree in physics at Colorado State University in 1952. For further study, he went to Penn State University and did a Ph.D. in physics and mineralogy in 1956 and to Cambridge University for a Ph.D. in crystallography in 1960.

Robert E. Newnham Ferroelectrics Award, awarded by the Institute of Electrical and Electronics Engineers, is named after him.

In April 2009, he died at the age of 80.

Awards and honors 
 Jeppson Medal
 E.C. Henry Award
 Bleininger Award
 David Kingery Award of the American Ceramic Society
 Ultrasonics Achievement Award of the IEEE
 Centennial Award of the Japan Ceramics Society
 Adaptive Structures Prize of the American Society of Mechanical Engineers
 Benjamin Franklin Medal for Electrical Engineering from the Franklin Institute (2004)
 Basic Research Award of the World Academy of Ceramics

References 

1929 births
2009 deaths
Pennsylvania State University faculty
Benjamin Franklin Medal (Franklin Institute) laureates
Pennsylvania State University alumni
Alumni of the University of Cambridge
Hartwick College alumni
Colorado State University alumni